Marilyn Louise Flynn is the former dean of the USC Suzanne Dworak-Peck School of Social Work.

Education
From the University of Illinois Urbana-Champaign, Flynn earned a PhD in 1976 and MSW in 1964. In 1960, she earned an AB in history and sociology from Roosevelt University?

Career
Between 1992 and 1997, Flynn was Director of the Institute of Public Policy and Social Research as well as Michigan State University’s School of Social Work. She was an associate professor at the University of Michigan School of Social Work between 1985 and 1991.

Flynn was appointed USC Dean in 1997and was only the second woman to hold that position.  She established new graduate academic centers in West Los Angeles and San Diego,  began a web based Master of Social Work program in 2010, began the first military social work specialization and created the first career services program for social workers.

Awards and honors
Flynn has received the international Sarnat Prize for Advancement of Social Work and in 2015, the USC Provost’s Inaugural Prize for Innovation in Educational practice.

Bribery case
Between 1997 and 2018, Flynn was a USC dean and tenured professor. In 2018, Los Angeles City Councilman Mark Ridley-Thomas, through his political campaign fund, gave $100,000 to Flynn’s school. The school then passed the money on to a think tank connected to the councilman’s son, Sebastian Ridley-Thomas.  In June 2018, the school reported their concerns over possible inappropriate financial transactions to legal authorities.

In 2022, Flynn agreed to plead guilty to federal bribery charges and is expected to be sentenced on March 20, 2023. The maximum sentence is ten years in prison but prosecutors are expected to ask for one year house arrest and at least $100,000 in fines.

References

University of Michigan faculty
University of Southern California staff
University of Illinois Urbana-Champaign alumni
Bribery scandals
Roosevelt University alumni
Social work scholars
Living people
Year of birth missing (living people)